Cypress Lake is an unincorporated community and census-designated place (CDP) in Lee County, Florida, United States. The population was 13,727 at the 2020 census. It is part of the Cape Coral-Fort Myers, Florida Metropolitan Statistical Area.

Geography
Cypress Lake is located in central Lee County at  (26.538054, -81.901533). It is bordered to the west by McGregor, to the north by Whiskey Creek, and to the east by Villas, all unincorporated communities that are census-designated places.

Demographics

As of the census of 2000, there were 12,072 people, 6,348 households, and 3,548 families residing in the CDP. The racial makeup of the CDP was 96.66% White, 1.04% African American, 0.12% Native American, 0.62% Asian, 0.03% Pacific Islander, 0.55% from other races, and 0.97% from two or more races. Hispanic or Latino of any race were 3.62% of the population.

There were 6,348 households, out of which 12.8% had children under the age of 18 living with them, 47.1% were married couples living together, 6.7% had a female householder with no husband present, and 44.1% were non-families. 38.2% of all households were made up of individuals, and 21.1% had someone living alone who was 65 years of age or older.  The average household size was 1.89 and the average family size was 2.42.

In the CDP, the population was spread out, with 11.7% under the age of 18, 4.3% from 18 to 24, 19.5% from 25 to 44, 25.3% from 45 to 64, and 39.2% who were 65 years of age or older.  The median age was 57 years. For every 100 females, there were 82.3 males.  For every 100 females age 18 and over, there were 78.8 males.

The median income for a household in the CDP was $35,405, and the median income for a family was $45,605. Males had a median income of $31,663 versus $25,958 for females. The per capita income for the CDP was $22,799.  About 4.4% of families and 7.2% of the population were below the poverty line, including 12.1% of those under age 18 and 5.0% of those age 65 or over.

References

Census-designated places in Lee County, Florida
Census-designated places in Florida